Hiyama may refer to:

Hiyama (surname), a Japanese surname
Hiyama Subprefecture, a subprefecture of Hokkaidō, Japan
Hiyama District, Hokkaidō, a district in Hiyama Subprefecture

See also
Hiyama coupling, a carbon-carbon bond-forming reaction
Nozaki–Hiyama–Kishi reaction, a carbon-carbon bond-forming reaction